Hypselodoris lacuna is a species of sea slug or dorid nudibranch, a marine gastropod mollusc in the family Chromodorididae.

Distribution
This nudibranch was described from Tingloy, Batangas, Luzon, Philippines, . It is reported from the western Indian Ocean of Aldabra Atoll to the western Pacific of Vanuatu, Indonesia, Papua New Guinea, the Philippines and Japan.

Description
Hypselodoris lacuna has an opaque white body with round transparent patches centred with black or grey spots. At the edge of the mantle there are small blue-grey spots. The gills have orange pigment lines on the outer face. The rhinophores have orange-brown clubs and translucent bases. This species can reach a total length of at least 12 mm.

References

Chromodorididae
Gastropods described in 2018